"The Good, the Bad and the Ugly" is the theme to the 1966 film of the same name, which was directed by Sergio Leone. Included on the film soundtrack as "The Good, the Bad and the Ugly (main title)", the instrumental piece was composed by Ennio Morricone, with Bruno Nicolai conducting the orchestra. A cover version by Hugo Montenegro in 1968 was a pop hit in both the US and the UK. It has since become one of the most iconic scores in film history.

Ennio Morricone version
Ennio Morricone was an Italian composer who created music for hundreds of films. In the 1960s, director Sergio Leone was impressed by a musical arrangement of Morricone's and asked his former schoolmate to compose music for one of his films, A Fistful of Dollars. This led to a collaboration between the two on future Leone films, many of which came to be referred to as "Spaghetti Westerns". After a steady percussion beat, the theme to The Good, the Bad and the Ugly begins with a two-note melody sounding like the howl of a coyote. Additional sounds follow, some of which symbolize characters and themes from the film. This instrumental composition plays at the beginning of the film. Morricone commented that his frequent collaborator guitarist Bruno Battisti D'Amario was "able to conjure up extraordinary sounds with his guitar" recording the composition.
The music is complex and features soprano recorder, drums, bass ocarina, chimes, electric guitar, trumpets, whistling, and lyrics sung by a choir including simple words like "wah wah wah", "go go go eh go", "who who who", etc.

Largely due to the memorable quality of the main theme, the film's soundtrack peaked at #4 on the Billboard 200 album chart, and it stayed on this chart for over a year.

Hugo Montenegro version
Hugo Montenegro was an American composer and orchestra leader who began scoring films in the 1960s. After hearing the music from The Good, the Bad and the Ugly, he decided to create a cover version of the theme. Musician Tommy Morgan is quoted in Wesley Hyatt's The Billboard Book of #1 Adult Contemporary Hits as saying that Montenegro's version "...was done in one day. I think it was all day one Saturday at RCA." Similar to Morricone's original composition, Montenegro and a few session musicians sought to recreate this record using their own instrumentation. The opening two note segment was played on an ocarina by Art Smith; Morgan provided the sounds that followed on a harmonica. He was quoted as saying: "I knew it was live, so I had to do this hand thing, the 'wah-wah-wah' sound." Hyatt's book states that Montenegro himself "grunted something which came out like 'rep, rup, rep, rup, rep'" between the chorus segments. Other musicians heard on the record include Elliot Fisher (electric violin), Mannie Klein (piccolo trumpet) and Muzzy Marcellino, whose whistling is heard during the recording.

Much to the surprise of Montenegro and the musicians who worked with him, this cover of the film theme became a hit single during 1968. It peaked at #2 on the Billboard Hot 100 chart on 1 June 1968, held off the top spot by another song from a film, Simon & Garfunkel's "Mrs. Robinson" (from the 1967 film The Graduate). It spent three weeks atop the Billboard Easy Listening chart during the same time frame. In September 1968, Montenegro's version reached the UK Singles Chart and began a steady climb, eventually reaching the top of the chart on 16 November and remaining there for four weeks.

Other uses
Detailing this piece in a description of the film soundtrack, the website CD Universe states that it is "so familiar as to be a cultural touchstone. Even an abbreviated sound byte of the theme is enough to conjure images of desolate desert plains, rolling tumbleweeds, and a cowboy-booted figure standing ominously in the distance." It has been used frequently to convey these sorts of images on radio, film and television in the years since the film's release. The Simpsons has used the opening notes of this theme in multiple episodes over the years.

Numerous musicians have, in full or in part, borrowed from this piece. Bill Berry, former drummer of the band R.E.M., played what was dubbed an "Ennio whistle" on the track "How the West Was Won and Where It Got Us", from their 1996 album New Adventures in Hi-Fi. The American punk rock group Ramones were known to play a recording of this piece at the beginning of their concerts, while at the end of their shows, a snippet of "The Ecstasy of Gold" was played.

The song was used in Argentinian and Portuguese TV commercials for Camel Cigarettes in 1981. The theme was used in 2014 for commercials for the Nissan Altima and also was used in 2015 for a Nestlé Dancow 1+ milk commercial in Indonesia.

Comedian Eddie Murphy whistled the opening notes during the "Shoe-Throwing Mother" monologue of his 1983 Delirious television special.

References

External links
Montenegro 7" vinyl (UK) Discogs
Montenegro 7" vinyl (US) Discogs

1966 songs
1966 compositions
1968 singles
Ennio Morricone songs
Hugo Montenegro songs
Irish Singles Chart number-one singles
1960s instrumentals
Film theme songs
UK Singles Chart number-one singles
RCA Records singles
Dollars Trilogy